Zhang Tong  (born 3 April 1984) is a Chinese women's international footballer who plays as a midfielder. She is a member of the China women's national football team. She was part of the team at the 2007 FIFA Women's World Cup. On club level she plays for Beijing Chenjian in China.

References

1984 births
Living people
Chinese women's footballers
China women's international footballers
Place of birth missing (living people)
2007 FIFA Women's World Cup players
Women's association football midfielders
Footballers at the 2006 Asian Games
Asian Games bronze medalists for China
Asian Games medalists in football
Medalists at the 2006 Asian Games